Sam Retford (born 22 June 1999) is an Australian-English actor, known for portraying the role of Cory Wilson on the Channel 4 drama Ackley Bridge. As well as starring in various stage productions, he has also made appearances in television series such as Casualty and Death in Paradise. In 2021, he joined the cast of the ITV soap opera Coronation Street as Curtis Delamere.

Early life
Retford was born on 22 June 1999 in Gosford, New South Wales, Australia. His family then relocated to Crewe, England. He attended Brine Leas High School, and later studied acting at The Lowry Actors Company. Before he began acting professionally, Retford aspired to be a marine biologist.

Career
Retford began acting in fringe productions around the Manchester theatre scene, such as Lord of the Flies and The Newspaper Boy. Retford made his television debut in Hollyoaks: Tom’s Life, a Hollyoaks spinoff series. The series premiered in 2014 on All 4, and he portrayed the role of Nate for four episodes. From 2017 to 2019, he portrayed the role of Cory Wilson in the Channel 4 school drama Ackley Bridge. His storylines in the series revolved around the subject of domestic abuse, coming to terms with his sexuality, and having an illegal relationship with a teacher.

In August 2018, he co-starred in the musical Closets alongside Lloyd Daniels. In February 2019, Retford made his London theatre debut when he starred in Kings of Idle Land as Michael, at VAULTS festival. Later that year, Retford appeared at Diana Award anti-bullying events in Blackpool and London. In December 2019, he portrayed the role of Tyler Begbie in an episode of the BBC medical drama Casualty. In 2020, Retford starred in the short film S.A.M. Later that year, it was announced that he would appear in the tenth series of Death in Paradise. In May 2021, Retford joined the cast of the ITV soap opera Coronation Street as Curtis Delamere. Later that year, he was cast in the musical film White Wedding as Hunter.

Filmography

Stage

References

External links

 

1999 births
21st-century Australian male actors
21st-century British male actors
Australian emigrants to England
Australian expatriates in England
Australian male child actors
Australian male film actors
Australian male stage actors
Australian male soap opera actors
British male child actors
British male film actors
British male soap opera actors
British male stage actors
Living people
People from Crewe
People from Gosford